Lingampalli railway station is a railway station in Hyderabad, Telangana, India. Localities like BHEL Township and University of Hyderabad are accessible from this station. Some trains such as Palnadu Express and other Express and Passenger trains originating or passing from Hyderabad and Secunderabad railway stations halt at this station.

Overview

Lines

Hyderabad Multi-Modal Transport System
Falaknuma–Lingampalli route  (FL Line)
Hyderabad–Lingampalli route (HL Line)

Facilities
Railway station entrance is equipped with luggage scanning facility. State Bank of India ATM is present in the platform. Well maintained retiring rooms available for all class travellers. Enough parking place with paid parking facility is available near to platform 1.

References

MMTS stations in Hyderabad
Secunderabad railway division